Alonzo is a 1773 tragedy by the British writer John Home.

The original Drury Lane cast included Samuel Reddish as Alonzo, Francis Aickin as King of Asturia, James Aickin as Costolo, Thomas Jefferson as Velasco, John Palmer as Sebastian, Laurence Clinch as Alberto, John Bannister as Messenger and Ann Street Barry as Orisminda.

References

Bibliography
 Nicoll, Allardyce. A History of English Drama 1660–1900: Volume III. Cambridge University Press, 2009.
 Hogan, C.B (ed.) The London Stage, 1660–1800: Volume V. Southern Illinois University Press, 1968.

1773 plays
Tragedy plays
West End plays
Plays by John Home